The Sydney International Equestrian Centre (SIEC for short) is the facility which was used to host equestrian events during the 2000 Summer Olympics and 2000 Summer Paralympics. The centre is located 45 kilometres from Sydney's business district and the harbour at Saxony Road, Horsley Park. Construction began in 1997, was finished in 1999 and it successfully hosted Olympic and Paralympic equestrian events in 2000.

Olympics & Paralympics
The events for the Olympics were held from 16 September to 1 October, while the Paralympic events were held between 18 and 29 October.

Post Olympics Usage
As with other Sydney Olympic facilities, the centre has continued to be used, upgraded & maintained after the Games. The Centre continues to host equestrian and other sporting events and remains an international standard equestrian sports facility. There are 10 km of trails, steeple chase tracks and cross country courses, large indoor & outdoor arenas with spectator seating, accommodation, administration buildings, conference rooms and horse stabling.

References
2000 Summer Olympics official report. Volume 1. p. 388.

External links
Official Website

Sports venues in Sydney
Venues of the 2000 Summer Olympics
Olympic equestrian venues
Sports venues completed in 1999
Buildings and structures in Sydney
Indoor arenas in Australia
Equestrian sports in Australia
1999 establishments in Australia